Jason Ganzel is a television screenwriter. He worked as part of the production staff on several television series, including Married to the Kellys, Kevin Hill, So Little Time, and The Ellen Show. In 2004, he became the assistant to Marc Cherry, creator of Desperate Housewives, and eventually joined the writing staff of the series.

External links
 

American soap opera writers
American male screenwriters
Year of birth missing (living people)
Living people
American male television writers
Place of birth missing (living people)